John Bainbridge Webster  (1955–2016) was an Anglican priest and theologian writing in the area of systematic, historical, and moral theology.  Born in Mansfield, England, on 20 June 1955, he was educated at the independent Bradford Grammar School and at the University of Cambridge. After a distinguished career, he died at his home in Scotland on 25 May 2016 at the age of 60. At the time of his death, he was the Chair of Divinity at St. Mary's College, University of St Andrews, Scotland.

Career 
Webster began his career as a chaplain and tutor at St John's College, Durham University (1982–86) and went on to teach systematic theology at Wycliffe College at the University of Toronto – one of the seven colleges that comprise the Toronto School of Theology (1986–1996) – before becoming the Lady Margaret Professor of Divinity at the University of Oxford, a prestigious chair in which he was immediately preceded by Rowan Williams who later became Archbishop of Wales (1999–2002) and then Canterbury (2002–2012).  During Webster's seven-year tenure at Oxford (1996–2003), he also served as a canon of Christ Church.  In 2003, he was installed in the Chair of Systematic Theology at King's College, University of Aberdeen, Scotland.  In Summer 2013, he became Chair of Divinity at the University of St Andrews. He was elected a Fellow of the Royal Society of Edinburgh in 2005.

Together with Colin Gunton (1940–2003), Webster co-founded the International Journal of Systematic Theology. He was also a member of the editorial boards of the International Journal for the Study of the Christian Church and of the Scottish Journal of Theology Monographs. He was the series editor of The Great Theologians, Barth Studies for Ashgate, and co-editor for the Oxford Handbook of Systematic Theology (2007).

Theological commorancy 
His PhD thesis was on the German Lutheran systematic and philosophical theologian Eberhard Jüngel: Distinguishing Between God and Man: Aspects of the Theology of Eberhard Jüngel (1982). Subsequently, Webster's translations and theological interaction with Jüngel are largely responsible for introducing him to the English speaking academy. Through study of Jüngel, Webster became well acquainted with the theology of Karl Barth whom he has written on extensively and developed a unique account of, which stresses the significant role of biblical interpretation and the Reformed tradition in Barth's work. Jüngel and Barth present important influences on Webster's own constructive dogmatic work, which offers that the most reliable articulation of Christian truth is that made in shared attention with the Reformation's renewal of Chalcedonian Christianity and guided by the perfect and free God who makes himself the proper object of extended paraphrase by his active self-presentation in Jesus Christ through the power of the Holy Spirit.

In September 2007, Webster delivered the inaugural lectures of the Kantzer Lectures in Revealed Theology moderated by Kevin Vanhoozer through the Carl F. H. Henry Center for Theological Understanding at Trinity Evangelical Divinity School in Deerfield, Illinois.

Selected works

Thesis

Translations or works on Eberhard Jüngel

Works on Karl Barth

Constructive works

Exhortative works

Other

Articles

Sources

External links 
Webster's webpage at the University of Aberdeen
Webster's webpage at the University of St. Andrews
Kantzer Lectures at the Henry Center
Webster at Frost's Scottish Who's Who
John Webster at Theopedia

Links to audio lectures 
"Perfection and Presence: God With Us, According to the Christian Confession", Kantzer Lectures in Revealed Theology at Trinity Evangelical Divinity School
"On Mercy", 2007 Christianity and Ethics Conference at Garrett Evangelical Theological Seminary

1955 births
2016 deaths
20th-century Anglican theologians
20th-century English Anglican priests
English Anglican theologians
Fellows of Christ Church, Oxford
Fellows of the British Academy
People from Mansfield
Systematic theologians
Academics of the University of Aberdeen
Fellows of the Royal Society of Edinburgh
British chaplains
Anglican chaplains
Alumni of Clare College, Cambridge
Academics of the University of St Andrews
Academics of Durham University
Lady Margaret Professors of Divinity
Academic staff of the University of Toronto
English male non-fiction writers
20th-century English male writers